The Queensland Rugby League Team of the Century is a hypothetical team comprising the best players who have played for Queensland to form a team for 1909 until 2008. Rugby league in Queensland was initiated in 1909 with the Queensland Rugby Football League competition, which evolved into the Brisbane Rugby Football League in 1922. In 1988, a national competition encompassing all Australian states including Queensland meant that the Brisbane Rugby Football League competition became a second tier to the national competition. Today, three Queensland clubs participate in the national competition while two formerly did so.

The team was announced at the Brisbane Convention and Exhibition Centre on 10 June 2008, ahead of the second State of Origin game in Brisbane. The players eligible for the team are players originally from Queensland and even though some players went to New South Wales and played for them under residential selection rules, these players could be chosen under their place of origin. The team was picked by a team of six judges in 2008 from a list of 100 nominated players. The judges were former administrator Kevin Brasch, former Queensland halfback Cyril Connell, writer Ian Heads, historian Professor Max Howell, commentator John McCoy and historian Greg Shannon.

The team

Notes

 The position the player were chosen in the Team of the Century.
 The Australian clubs/teams the player played for during his career.
 The number of games he played at state level for Queensland during his career.
 The number of games he played at national level for Australia during his career.
 The Clubs, Queensland and Australia columns are in terms of his coaching career, not his playing career.

References

Century